The Respect to Mehmetçik Memorial is a monument in the Gallipoli peninsula, Çanakkale Province, Turkey. It is located in the Eceabat district of Çanakkale Province in the southern end of Albayrak heights within the Gallipoli Peninsula Historical Site which is facing the Anzac Cove. Mehmetçik is a common name given to soldiers in a war, akin to G.I. in the US.

History
The monument, which was created by the Turkish sculptor Tankut Öktem (1941–2007) in 1997, is a sculpture of a Turkish soldier carrying an Australian officer.  The sculpture is based on an event in the Dardanelles Campaign of the World War I in which a Turkish soldier, after raising a white flag, carried a wounded Australian officer to Australian lines and returned to his lines before fighting resumed. There is also an inscription of a statement made by Lord Richard Casey then a lieutenant and the staff captain with the 3rd Brigade in the Australian army, during a visit to Turkey about his respect for the Turkish army.

References

Gallipoli campaign
World War I memorials in Turkey
Eceabat District
Turkish military memorials and cemeteries
Buildings and structures in Çanakkale Province
1997 establishments in Turkey
Tourist attractions in Çanakkale Province
Bronze sculptures in Turkey
Sculptures of men in Turkey